Foams are materials formed by trapping pockets of gas in a liquid or solid.

A bath sponge and the head on a glass of beer are examples of foams. In most foams, the volume of gas is large, with thin films of liquid or solid separating the regions of gas. Soap foams are also known as suds.

Solid foams can be closed-cell or open-cell. In closed-cell foam, the gas forms discrete pockets, each completely surrounded by the solid material. In open-cell foam, gas pockets connect to each other. A bath sponge is an example of an open-cell foam: water easily flows through the entire structure, displacing the air. A sleeping mat is an example of a closed-cell foam: gas pockets are sealed from each other so the mat cannot soak up water.

Foams are examples of dispersed media. In general, gas is present, so it divides into gas bubbles of different sizes (i.e., the material is polydisperse)—separated by liquid regions that may form films, thinner and thinner when the liquid phase drains out of the system films. When the principal scale is small, i.e., for a very fine foam, this dispersed medium can be considered a type of colloid.

Foam can also refer to something that is analogous to foam, such as quantum foam.

Structure
A foam is, in many cases, a multi-scale system.

One scale is the bubble: material foams are typically disordered and have a variety of bubble sizes. At larger sizes, the study of idealized foams is closely linked to the mathematical problems of minimal surfaces and three-dimensional tessellations, also called honeycombs. The Weaire–Phelan structure is considered the best possible (optimal) unit cell of a perfectly ordered foam, while Plateau's laws describe how soap-films form structures in foams.

At lower scale than the bubble is the thickness of the film for metastable foams, which can be considered a network of interconnected films called lamellae. Ideally, the lamellae connect in triads and radiate 120° outward from the connection points, known as Plateau borders.

An even lower scale is the liquid–air interface at the surface of the film. Most of the time this interface is stabilized by a layer of amphiphilic structure, often made of surfactants, particles (Pickering emulsion), or more complex associations.

Mechanical properties of solid foams
Solid foams, both open-cell and closed-cell, are considered as a sub-class of cellular structures. They often have lower nodal connectivity as compared to other cellular structures like honeycombs and truss lattices, and thus, their failure mechanism is dominated by bending of members. Low nodal connectivity and the resulting failure mechanism ultimately lead to their lower mechanical strength and stiffness compared to honeycombs and truss lattices.

Formation
Several conditions are needed to produce foam: there must be mechanical work, surface active components (surfactants) that reduce the surface tension, and the formation of foam faster than its breakdown.
To create foam, work (W) is needed to increase the surface area (ΔA):

where γ is the surface tension.

One of the ways foam is created is through dispersion, where a large amount of gas is mixed with a liquid. A more specific method of dispersion involves injecting a gas through a hole in a solid into a liquid. If this process is completed very slowly, then one bubble can be emitted from the orifice at a time as shown in the picture below.

One of the theories for determining the separation time is shown below; however, while this theory produces theoretical data that matches with the experimental data, detachment due to capillarity is accepted as a better explanation.

The buoyancy force acts to raise the bubble, which is

where  is the volume of the bubble,  is the acceleration due to gravity, and ρ1 is the density of the gas ρ2 is the density of the liquid. The force working against the buoyancy force is the surface tension force, which is

,
As more air is pushed into the bubble, the buoyancy force grows quicker than the surface tension force. Thus, detachment occurs when the buoyancy force is large enough to overcome the surface tension force. 

Examining this phenomenon from a capillarity viewpoint for a bubble that is being formed very slowly, it can be assumed that the pressure  inside is constant everywhere. The change in pressure across the interface from gas to liquid is equal to the capillary pressure; hence,

where R1 and R2 are the radii of curvature and are set as positive. At the stem of the bubble, R3 and R4 are the radii of curvature also treated as positive.  Here the hydrostatic pressure in the liquid has to take in account z,  the distance from the top to the stem of the bubble. The new hydrostatic pressure at the stem of the bubble is p0(ρ1 − ρ2)z.  The hydrostatic pressure balances the capillary pressure, which is shown below:

Finally, the difference in the top and bottom pressure equal the change in hydrostatic pressure:

At the stem of the bubble, the shape of the bubble is nearly cylindrical; consequently,  either R3 or R4 is large while the other radius of curvature is small. As the stem of the bubble grows in length, it becomes more unstable as one of the radius grows and the other shrinks.  At a certain point, the vertical length of the stem exceeds the circumference of the stem and due to the buoyancy forces the bubble separates and the process repeats.

Stability

Stabilization

The stabilization of a foam is caused by van der Waals forces between the molecules in the foam, electrical double layers created by dipolar surfactants, and the Marangoni effect, which acts as a restoring force to the lamellae.

The Marangoni effect depends on the liquid that is foaming being impure.  Generally, surfactants in the solution decrease the surface tension. The surfactants also clump together on the surface and form a layer as  shown below.

For the Marangoni effect to occur, the foam must be indented as shown in the first picture.  This indentation increases local surface area. Surfactants have a larger diffusion time than the bulk of the solution—so the surfactants are less concentrated in the indentation.

Also, surface stretching makes the surface tension of the indented spot greater than the surrounding area.  Consequentially—since diffusion time for the surfactants is large—the Marangoni effect has time to take place. The difference in surface tension creates a gradient, which instigates fluid flow from areas of lower surface tension to areas of higher surface tension.  The second picture shows the film at equilibrium after the Marangoni effect has taken place.

Destabilization
Witold Rybczynski and Jacques Hadamard developed an equation to calculate the velocity of bubbles that rise in foam with the assumption that the bubbles are spherical with a radius .

with velocity in units of centimeters per second. ρ1 and ρ2 is the density for a gas and liquid respectively in units of g/cm3 and ῃ1 and ῃ2 is the viscosity of the gas and liquid g/cm·s and g is the acceleration in units of cm/s2.

However, since the density and viscosity of a liquid is much greater than the gas, the density and viscosity of the gas can be neglected, which yields the new equation for velocity of bubbles rising as:

However, through experiments it has been shown that a more accurate model for bubbles rising is:

Deviations are due to the Marangoni effect and capillary pressure, which affect the assumption that the bubbles are spherical.
For laplace pressure of a curved gas liquid interface, the two principal radii of curvature at a point are R1 and R2. With a curved interface, the pressure in one phase is greater than the pressure in another phase. The capillary pressure Pc is given by the equation of:

,
where  is the surface tension. The bubble shown below is a gas (phase 1) in a liquid (phase 2) and point A designates the top of the bubble while point B designates the bottom of the bubble. 

At the top of the bubble at point A, the pressure in the liquid is assumed to be p0 as well as in the gas.  At the bottom of the bubble at point B, the hydrostatic pressure is:

where ρ1 and ρ2 is the density for a gas and liquid respectively.  The difference in hydrostatic pressure at the top of the bubble is 0, while the difference in hydrostatic pressure at the bottom of the bubble across the interface is gz(ρ2 − ρ1).  Assuming that the radii of curvature at point A are equal and denoted by RA and that the radii of curvature at point B are equal and denoted by RB, then the difference in capillary pressure between point A and point B is:

At equilibrium, the difference in capillary pressure must be balanced by the difference in hydrostatic pressure.  Hence,

Since, the density of the gas is less than the density of the liquid the left hand side of the equation is always positive.  Therefore, the inverse of RA must be larger than the RB. Meaning that from the top of the bubble to the bottom of the bubble the radius of curvature increases. Therefore, without neglecting gravity the bubbles cannot be spherical.  In addition, as z increases, this causes the difference in RA and RB too, which means the bubble deviates more from its shape the larger it grows.

Foam destabilization occurs for several reasons. First, gravitation causes drainage of liquid to the foam base, which Rybczynski and Hadamar include in their theory; however, foam also destabilizes due to osmotic pressure causes drainage from the lamellas to the Plateau borders due to internal concentration differences in the foam, and Laplace pressure causes diffusion of gas from small to large bubbles due to pressure difference. In addition, films can break under disjoining pressure, These effects can lead to rearrangement of the foam structure at scales larger than the bubbles, which may be individual (T1 process) or collective (even of the "avalanche" type).

Experiments and characterizations
Being a multi-scale system involving many phenomena, and a versatile medium, foam can be studied using many different techniques. Considering the different scales, experimental techniques are diffraction ones, mainly light scattering techniques (DWS, see below, static and dynamic light scattering, X-rays and neutron scattering) at sub-micrometer scales, or microscopic ones. Considering the system as continuous, its bulk properties can be characterized by light transmittance but also conductimetry. The correlation between structure and bulk is evidenced more accurately by acoustics in particular. The organisation between bubbles has been studied numerically using sequential attempts of evolution of the minimum surface energy either at random (Pott's model) or deterministic way (surface evolver). The evolution with time (i.e., the dynamics) can be simulated using these models, or the bubble model (Durian), which considers the motion of individual bubbles.

Observations of the small-scale structure can be made by shining the foam with laser light or x-ray beams and measuring the reflectivity of the films between bubbles. Observations of the global structure can be done using neutron scattering.

A typical light scattering (or diffusion) optical technique, multiple light scattering coupled with vertical scanning, is the most widely used technique to monitor the dispersion state of a product, hence identifying and quantifying destabilization phenomena. It works on any concentrated dispersions without dilution, including foams. When light is sent through the sample, it is backscattered by the bubbles. The backscattering intensity is directly proportional to the size and volume fraction of the dispersed phase. Therefore, local changes in concentration (drainage, syneresis) and global changes in size (ripening, coalescence) are detected and monitored.

Applications

Liquid foams
Liquid foams can be used in fire retardant foam, such as those that are used in extinguishing fires, especially oil fires.

In some ways, leavened bread is a foam, as the yeast causes the bread to rise by producing tiny bubbles of gas in the dough. The dough has traditionally been understood as a closed-cell foam, in which the pores do not connect with each other. Cutting the dough releases the gas in the bubbles that are cut, but the gas in the rest of the dough cannot escape. When dough is allowed to rise too far, it becomes an open-cell foam, in which the gas pockets are connected. Cutting the dough or the surface otherwise breaking at that point would cause a large volume of gas to escape, and the dough would collapse. The open structure of an over-risen dough is easy to observe: instead of consisting of discrete gas bubbles, the dough consists of a gas space filled with threads of the flour-water paste. Recent research has indicated that the pore structure in bread is 99% interconnected into one large vacuole, thus the closed-cell foam of the moist dough is transformed into an open cell solid foam in the bread.

The unique property of gas-liquid foams having very high specific surface area is exploited in the chemical processes of froth flotation and foam fractionation.

Solid foams

Solid foams are a class of lightweight cellular engineering materials. These foams are typically classified into two types based on their pore structure: open-cell-structured foams (also known as reticulated foams) and closed-cell foams. At high enough cell resolutions, any type can be treated as continuous or "continuum" materials and are referred to as cellular solids, with predictable mechanical properties.

Open-cell-structured foams contain pores that are connected to each other and form an interconnected network that is relatively soft. Open-cell foams fill with whatever gas surrounds them. If filled with air, a relatively good insulator results, but, if the open cells fill with water, insulation properties would be reduced. Recent studies have put the focus on studying the properties of open-cell foams as an insulator material. Wheat gluten/TEOS bio-foams have been produced, showing similar insulator properties as for those foams obtained from oil-based resources. Foam rubber is a type of open-cell foam.

Closed-cell foams do not have interconnected pores. The closed-cell foams normally have higher compressive strength due to their structures. However, closed-cell foams are also, in general more dense, require more material, and as a consequence are more expensive to produce. The closed cells can be filled with a specialized gas to provide improved insulation. The closed-cell structure foams have higher dimensional stability, low moisture absorption coefficients, and higher strength compared to open-cell-structured foams. All types of foam are widely used as core material in sandwich-structured composite materials.

The earliest known engineering use of cellular solids is with wood, which in its dry form is a closed-cell foam composed of lignin, cellulose, and air. From the early 20th century, various types of specially manufactured solid foams came into use. The low density of these foams makes them excellent as thermal insulators and flotation devices and their lightness and compressibility make them ideal as packing materials and stuffings.

An example of the use of azodicarbonamide as a blowing agent is found in the manufacture of vinyl (PVC) and EVA-PE foams, where it plays a role in the formation of air bubbles by breaking down into gas at high temperature.

The random or "stochastic" geometry of these foams makes them good for energy absorption, as well. In the late 20th century to early 21st century, new manufacturing techniques have allowed for geometry that results in excellent strength and stiffness per weight. These new materials are typically referred to as engineered cellular solids.

Syntactic foam

A special class of closed-cell foams, known as syntactic foam, contains hollow particles embedded in a matrix material. The spheres can be made from several materials, including glass, ceramic, and polymers. The advantage of syntactic foams is that they have a very high strength-to-weight ratio, making them ideal materials for many applications, including deep-sea and space applications. One particular syntactic foam employs shape memory polymer as its matrix, enabling the foam to take on the characteristics of shape memory resins and composite materials; i.e., it has the ability to be reshaped repeatedly when heated above a certain temperature and cooled. Shape memory foams have many possible applications, such as dynamic structural support, flexible foam core, and expandable foam fill.

Integral skin foam
Integral skin foam, also known as self-skin foam, is a type of foam with a high-density skin and a low-density core. It can be formed in an open-mold process or a closed-mold process. In the open-mold process, two reactive components are mixed and poured into an open mold. The mold is then closed and the mixture is allowed to expand and cure. Examples of items produced using this process include arm rests, baby seats, shoe soles, and mattresses. The closed-mold process, more commonly known as reaction injection molding (RIM), injects the mixed components into a closed mold under high pressures.

Defoaming

Foam, in this case meaning "bubbly liquid", is also produced as an often-unwanted by-product in the manufacture of various substances. For example, foam is a serious problem in the chemical industry, especially for biochemical processes. Many biological substances, for example proteins, easily create foam on agitation or aeration. Foam is a problem because it alters the liquid flow and blocks oxygen transfer from air (thereby preventing microbial respiration in aerobic fermentation processes). For this reason, anti-foaming agents, like silicone oils, are added to prevent these problems. Chemical methods of foam control are not always desired with respect to the problems (i.e., contamination, reduction of mass transfer) they may cause especially in food and pharmaceutical industries, where the product quality is of great importance. Mechanical methods to prevent foam formation are more common than chemical ones.

Speed of sound

The acoustical property of the speed of sound through a foam is of interest when analyzing failures of hydraulic components. The analysis involves calculating total hydraulic cycles to fatigue failure. The speed of sound in a foam is determined by the mechanical properties of the gas creating the foam: oxygen, nitrogen, or combinations.

Assuming that the speed of sound is based on the liquid's fluid properties leads to errors in calculating fatigue cycles and failure of mechanical hydraulic components. Using acoustical transducers and related instrumentation that set low limits (0–50,000 Hz with roll-off) causes errors. The low roll-off during measurement of actual frequency of acoustic cycles results in miscalculation due to actual hydraulic cycles in the possible ranges of 1–1000 MHz or higher. Instrumentation systems are most revealing when cycle bandwidths exceed the actual measured cycles by a factor of 10 to 100. Associated instrumentation costs also increase by factors of 10 to 100.

Most moving hydro-mechanical components cycle at 0–50 Hz, but entrained gas bubbles resulting in a foamy condition of the associated hydraulic fluid results in actual hydraulic cycles that can exceed 1000 MHz even if the moving mechanical components do not cycle at the higher cycle frequency.

Gallery

Foam scales and properties

See also
 Aluminium foam sandwich
 Ballistic foam
 Chaotic bubble
 Metal foam
 Nanofoam
 Sea foam
 Reversibly assembled cellular composite materials
 Foam party
 Soft matter

References

Further reading
 Thomas Hipke, Günther Lange, René Poss: Taschenbuch für Aluminiumschäume. Aluminium-Verlag, Düsseldorf 2007, .
 Hannelore Dittmar-Ilgen: Metalle lernen schwimmen. In: Dies.: Wie der Kork-Krümel ans Weinglas kommt. Hirzel, Stuttgart 2006, S. 74.

External links

 Andrew M. Kraynik, Douglas A. Reinelt, Frank van Swol Structure of random monodisperse foam
 D. L. Weaire, Stefan Hutzler (1999) The Physics of Foams
 

 
Colloids